William Robinson Baker (1820–1890) was a railroad executive, Texas State Senator and Mayor of Houston, Texas.

Early life
Baker was born on May 21, 1820, in Baldwinsville, New York to Asa Baker and the former Hannah Robinson.  He lived in New York until age 17 at which time he moved to Houston in the Republic of Texas. There he was a bookkeeper for the Houston Town Company for about two years.  Starting around 1839, he managed a general store for two years.  In 1841, Baker successfully ran for County Clerk of Harris County, a position he held for 16 years. In December 1845, Baker married Hester E. Runnels. She was a niece of former Mississippi Governor Hiram Runnels.

Career
In 1852, Baker became the Secretary of the Texas Central Railroad, and in 1856, Secretary of the Houston and Texas Central Railroad. He eventually became Director and the Vice President of the line. From 1868 to 1871 was President of the railroad, and from 1873 to 1875, served as Vice-President and Manager. He sold his interests and retired from the railroad business in 1877.

According to the 1860 United States Census, Baker owned real estate valued at $300,000 and personal property valued at $75,000.  Baker was one of just twenty-eight Texans in 1860 with at least $200,000 real estate assets.

In 1874, Baker was elected to the Texas Senate from the 16th District and served one term.

Baker was the first Houston mayor to hold office for three terms, serving the city from 1880 through 1886. He failed in a bid for a fourth term in 1886 when he lost the election by just four votes.

Death
Baker died April 30, 1890. He is buried at Glenwood Cemetery in Houston.

References

External links
 

1820 births
1890 deaths
Democratic Party Texas state senators
Mayors of Houston
Businesspeople from Houston
19th-century American politicians
19th-century American businesspeople